Tetelestai is the seventeenth album in the live praise and worship series of Christian Contemporary music by Diante do Trono.

Background 
The title comes from the Greek word τετέλεσται (tetelestai) meaning "it is completed", which according to St. John, is the last word of Jesus on the cross.

In the pre-recording of  Tetelestai, the mining group released the Tu Reinas album, recorded at the Events Park Padre Cícero, in Juazeiro do Norte.

The album contains 10 songs, all were written by Ana Paula Valadão, 8 new songs and two re-recordings from previous albums. The recording of the album took place in places like the Tower of David, Golgotha, the Garden of the Empty Tomb and the Mount of Olives. The event was thirteen days long. This is the first disc of the Diante do Trono recorded outside Brazil.

This recording captured the hearts of Israel. Several international TV news reported the recording that took place in the Tower of David, for example, CBN News, which did a story about the event and interviewed Ana Paula Valadão and her husband, Gustavo Bessa.

The event's audience had about 500 people, among these 382 people are formed by subscribers in a caravan.

CD track listing 

All songs written by Ana Paula Valadão. All songs led by Ana Paula Valadão except where noted.

References 

2015 live albums
2015 video albums
Live video albums
Portuguese-language live albums
Diante do Trono video albums
Diante do Trono live albums